The Rose of Kildare is a 1927 American silent romance film directed by Dallas M. Fitzgerald and starring Helene Chadwick, Pat O'Malley and Henry B. Walthall. An Irish singer arrives at the gold mining town of Kimberley in South Africa, where she encounters a former lover who left Kildare to seek his fortune. The film is believed to be lost, with no prints of the film existing in archives.

Cast
 Helene Chadwick as Eileen O'Moore 
 Pat O'Malley as Barry Nunan 
 Henry B. Walthall as Bob Avery 
 Lee Moran as 'The Kid' 
 Ed Brady as Ed Brady 
 Ena Gregory as Elsie Avery 
 Carroll Nye as Larry Nunan

References

Bibliography
 Munden, Kenneth White. The American Film Institute Catalog of Motion Pictures Produced in the United States, Part 1. University of California Press, 1997.

External links
 

1927 films
1920s romance films
American silent feature films
American romance films
Films directed by Dallas M. Fitzgerald
American black-and-white films
Films set in South Africa
Gotham Pictures films
1920s English-language films
1920s American films